The Ulster & Delaware Railroad Historical Society is a chapter of the National Railway Historical Society (NRHS).  It focuses on the history of the railroads and related social, economic, and cultural institutions of the Catskill and Hudson Valley regions. That history, which began with the charter of the Catskill & Ithaca Railroad in 1828, encompasses numerous proposed and built railroads and trolley lines within Ulster, Delaware, Greene, Schoharie, Albany and Otsego counties.

Historical focus

Ulster and Delaware Railroad
Delaware and Eastern Railroad/Delaware and Northern Railroad
Wallkill Valley Railroad
Catskill Mountain Railway
Rondout and Oswego Railroad
New York, Kingston and Syracuse Railroad
Stony Clove & Catskill Mountain Railroad
Kaaterskill Railroad
Hobart Branch Railroad
Delaware and Otsego Railroad
Catskill Mountain Branch of the New York Central and of Penn Central 
Canajoharie and Catskill Railroad
Cairo Railroad 
Catskill and Tannersville Railway
Otis Elevating Railway
Cooperstown and Charlotte Valley Railroad
Middleburgh and Schoharie Railroad
Schoharie Valley Railroad
Rhinebeck and Connecticut Railroad
Delaware and Hudson Railroad at and around Oneonta 
New York Central Railroad/West Shore Railroad at Kingston

Preservation activities

In Roxbury, New York, the Roxbury Railroad Station is owned by the Society and is being restored.  The society has opened the Roxbury Depot Museum in the depot, showcasing many artifacts and displays from the railroads mentioned above.

The society owns and is in the process of restoring: former NYO&W "Bobber" Caboose #8206, built at the NYO&W Middletown Shops in 1906; and former Brooklyn East District Terminal #14, a H. K. Porter, Inc Locomotive Works 0-6-0T steam locomotive, built in August 1920 at their facility in Pittsburgh, Pennsylvania. Both are currently stored in the Delaware and Ulster Railroad yards in Arkville, New York.

External links
 Ulster & Delaware Railroad Historical Society
 Delaware and Ulster Railroad

History of Ulster County, New York
Historical societies in New York (state)
Rail transportation preservation in the United States